Baudri is a surname. Notable people with the surname include:

Johann Anton Friedrich Baudri (1804–1893), German Roman Catholic priest
Friedrich Baudri (1808–1874), German painter and member of the Reichstag

See also
Baldric (disambiguation), for persons with the given name Baudri (French form of Baldric)